Kirn & Sandbank Parish Church is a Church of Scotland church building in Kirn, Argyll and Bute, Scotland. It also serves the population of nearby Sandbank. The church is located on Kirn Brae at its junction with Marine Parade, which leads to and from Dunoon, about a mile to the southwest. Constructed in the Romanesque style, it is a Category B listed building.

Its architect was Peter MacGregor Chalmers. Its red sandstone was brought from a quarry at Corrie on the Isle of Arran.

See also

List of listed buildings in Dunoon

References

External links
 Official website
 KIRN CHURCH OF SCOTLAND, KIRN BRAE - Historic Environment Scotland

Category B listed buildings in Argyll and Bute
Listed churches in Scotland
Churches in Argyll and Bute
1907 establishments in Scotland
Buildings and structures in Kirn